1972–73 was the 26th season of the Western International Hockey League.

Standings

 Spokane Jets				48		28	20	 0				256	178		 56
 Trail Smoke Eaters			48		24	23	 1				185	218		 49
 Cranbrook Royals			48		23	25	 0				218	203		 46
 Kimberley Dynamiters			48		22	25	 1				221	251		 45
 Nelson Maple Leafs 			48		21	25	 2				189	219		 44

Playoffs

In the "Best of 7" semi-finals:
 Spokane Jets defeated Kimberley Dynamiters 4 games to 1 (3-1, 5-3, 4-5 OT, 4-3, 3-2)
 Trail Smoke Eaters defeated Cranbrook Royals 4 games to 3 (3-2 OT, 0-1 OT, 6-1, 1-9, 6-1, 2-4, 5-3)

In the "Best of 7" final series, the Spokane Jets defeated Trail Smoke Eaters 4 games to 1 (7-3, 2-3, 3-2, 8-2, 9-4). The Spokane Jets advanced to the 1972-73 Western Canada Allan Cup Playoffs.

References 

Western International Hockey League seasons
Wihl
Wihl